Rudolph A. Weinert (December 19, 1894 – January 24, 1974) was a politician from Seguin, Texas, who served in the Texas Senate for 27 years.

Early life and family
Rudolph A. Weinert  was born December 19, 1894. Weinert was married to Johnnye Ponton from 1905 until her death in 1973. They had one daughter, Johnnye Jean Weinert Lovett.

Career
 Weinert  was a Democratic politician from Seguin, Texas. He served in the Texas Senate for 27 years from 1936 to 1963.
Weinert received 29 votes and was duly declared Dean of the Senate in 1947. Weinert died January 24, 1974.

References

1894 births
1974 deaths
People from Seguin, Texas
Texas state senators
People from San Antonio
20th-century American politicians